Villa Cetinale is a 17th-century Baroque villa and Italian garden in Tuscany. The property is best known for the expansive gardens, arrayed in classic symmetry, as well as for its woodland gardens.

History

17th century
The residence was originally a modest building surrounded by farm dwellings, owned by Fabio Chigi (1599-1667). Chigi employed Benedetto Giovannelli, a local architect, to design the plans for a new villa, whose construction occurred between 1651 and 1655. After Fabio Chigi became Pope Alexander VII, in 1655, work came to a halt.

In 1676, the villa and lands were inherited by the Pope's nephew, Cardinal Flavio Chigi (1631-1693), Prince of Farnese, Duke of Ariccia and Prince of the Holy Roman Empire. Cardinal Chigi employed the architect Carlo Fontana in 1680 to redesign the villa, originally called Villa Chigi, and plan the gardens. Fontana was a former pupil of Gian Lorenzo Bernini. His design transformed the villa into the Roman Baroque style.

After the death of Cardinal Chigi in 1693 it passed into his family, the Chigi-Zondadari, who retained it into the late 20th century.

20th century
Villa Cetinale, by then in a somewhat ruinous state, was acquired by British aristocrat Antony Lambton in 1977. Lambton retired there, following a personal scandal in England. For nearly three decades he meticulously restored the villa and the gardens' built features and plantings. He died in Siena in 2006. It is now available for private rental, with garden tours available by arrangement.

British writer and garden design aficionado Harold Acton translated the Latin inscription on Villa Cetinale as follows:

Garden

Main axis

The plan of the Villa Cetinale gardens is in the Giardino all'italiana style, with a strong solo primary axis.

It begins at the lower terminus far below the house, with a gigantic statue of Hercules. The axis extends across the natural and agricultural landscape, and the midway immediate villa surroundings, to its upper terminus, a hermitage—Romitorio high on the hill above.

On axis at the front façade of the villa is the Limonaia, a semi-walled potted lemon garden, accented with statues by Giuseppe Mazzuoli (1644-1725) and 'Baroque style' topiary. On axis at the rear façade a symmetrical double staircase rises to the primary villa entry, at the piano nobile ('floor one') level, following the Roman custom of reserving the ground floor unnumbered for the domestic service uses.

Behind the villa an avenue (allée) of Italian cypress (Cupressus sempervirens) defines the axis through gardens and fields to the base of the hill. A significant and very long stone stairway carries the axis up through the hillside's woodlands, to the focal point of the hermitage tower.

Other elements
From beside the villa a secondary axis extends northeast across a balustraded terrace, and through an olive grove to a very tall masonry bell tower, with clock.

There are several original non-axial elements of the gardens. Northeast of the main axis beyond the bell tower a garden walkway proceeds around a hill, going through the 'Holy Woods' with stone statues and sculptures of animals, also by Giuseppe Mazuoli. West across the axis a long looping walkway passes through open woods past a series of religious shrines with statues. Olive groves are also part of the landscape surrounding the villa and long axis.

The Lambton restoration also developed new off-axis garden terraces and flower gardens beside the villa.

Publications
Villa Cetinale was one of the 70 gardens included by Edith Wharton in her 1904 book Italian Villas and Their Gardens, with illustrations and a plan of it. The garden is also included in the 1997 book Edith Wharton’s Italian Gardens by Vivian Russell, and featured on the cover.

See also
 Italian Renaissance garden
 Giardino all'italiana
 Garden à la française — Baroque garden style.

References

Further reading
 
 Ramsay, A., and Attlee, H. Italian Gardens, Robertson McCarta, London 1989.
 Russell, Vivian. Edith Wharton’s Italian Gardens, 1997.

External links 
 Villa Cetinale: website — (English)
 Villa Cetinale: photo gallery
 https://www.flickr.com/search/?q=Villa+Cetinale&f=hp Flickr gallery] — all images tagged Villa Cetinale.

Villas in the Province of Siena
Italian Renaissance gardens
Gardens in Tuscany
Baroque architecture in Tuscany
Buildings and structures in Sovicille
Baroque villas
Woodland gardens